Intelsat 605, previously named Intelsat VI F-5, was a communications satellite operated by Intelsat. Launched in 1991, it was the fourth of five Intelsat VI satellites to be launched. The Intelsat VI series was constructed by Hughes Aircraft, based on the HS-389 satellite bus.

Intelsat 605 was launched at 23:15:13 UTC on 14 August 1991, atop an Ariane 4 44L carrier rocket, flight number V45. The launch took place from ELA-2 at Kourou, and placed Intelsat 605 into a geosynchronous transfer orbit. The satellite raised itself into its final geostationary orbit using two liquid-fuelled R-4D-12 engines, with the satellite arriving in geostationary orbit on 20 August 1991.

During late 1991, Intelsat 605 was operated at a longitude of 21.5 degrees west. In July 1992, it was placed at 24.5 degrees west, where it operated until November 1997. It subsequently operated at 27.5 degrees west from December 1997 to March 2003; 32.9 degrees east from April 2003 to October 2004; 77 degrees west from December 2004 to January 2005, and 174 degrees east from April 2005 to January 2009. It was placed into a graveyard orbit and decommissioned in January 2009.

References

Spacecraft launched in 1991
Intelsat satellites
Spacecraft decommissioned in 2009
Ariane commercial payloads
Derelict satellites orbiting Earth